Tramitichromis brevis is a species of cichlid endemic to Lake Malawi where it is found over sandy substrates or sand/rock substrates at about  depth.  It can reach a length of  TL.  It can also be found in the aquarium trade.

References

brevis
Taxa named by George Albert Boulenger
Fish described in 1908
Taxonomy articles created by Polbot